Loose Salute is the second solo album by American singer-songwriter Michael Nesmith released during his post-Monkees career. Issued by RCA Records in 1970 and dedicated to Tony Richland, it peaked at No. 159 on the Billboard Pop Albums charts.

History 
The version of "Listen to the Band" featured on the album is the song's third version; previous versions appeared on 33⅓ Revolutions per Monkee (featuring The Monkees' final performance of the 1960s with Peter Tork) and as a mid-1969 single by The Monkees. Nesmith also re-recorded his (then) unreleased Monkees song, "Carlisle Wheeling".  However, for Loose Salute, he changed the name of the song to "Conversations".

The album featured a quasi-instrumental number, "First National Dance," which was recorded for the album but replaced at the last minute by "Silver Moon", which was released as a single in Australia and did quite well there, reaching #14 on the charts. A cover of Jerry Reed's song "Guitar Man" was recorded but not issued on the album.  When the album was reissued with Magnetic South on CD by RCA/BMG International in 2000, the "First National Dance" was included on this release.

The track "Bye, Bye, Bye" went through eleven recording and mixing sessions before Nesmith was satisfied with the results; this delayed release of the album.

Reception 

Allmusic stated in their review "Loose Salute doesn't cohere quite as well as Magnetic South, but the material is strong, the band sounds great, and Michael Nesmith offered even more surprises than he had in his first turn at bat; it's one of the strongest records in his catalog as a solo artist."

Track listing
All songs by Michael Nesmith except where noted.
 "Silver Moon" – 3:15
 "I Fall to Pieces" (Harlan Howard, Hank Cochran) – 2:56
 "Thanx for the Ride" – 2:48
 "Dedicated Friend" – 2:27
 "Conversations" – 3:27
 "Tengo Amore" – 3:00
 "Listen to the Band" – 2:35
 "Bye, Bye, Bye" – 3:17
 "Lady of the Valley" – 2:57
 "Hello Lady" – 3:49

Personnel 
 Michael Nesmith – vocals & rhythm guitar
 John London – bass
 John Ware – drums
 Red Rhodes – pedal steel guitar
with:
 Glen Hardin – piano

References

1970 albums
Michael Nesmith albums
RCA Records albums
Albums produced by Michael Nesmith